KCIL (96.7 FM, "96.7 KCIL") is a radio station broadcasting a country music format. Licensed to Gray, Louisiana, United States, the station is currently owned by Lisa D. Stiglets through licensee JLE, Incorporated.

The station serves the Houma/Thibodaux metropolitan area of Southeastern Louisiana and is affiliated with the New Orleans Saints Radio Network.

History
This station was originally a Hot Adult Contemporary station focused on the East St. Mary Parish area centered on Morgan City, Louisiana as KMRC-FM at the time a 2,500 watt class A FM station. They flipped calls in 1979, to KFXY known locally as "Foxy 96" still broadcasting the Hot AC format. In the 1990s, the station changed hands to Guaranty Broadcasting of Baton Rouge who moved the station's studio to Houma and in 2000, the station changed calls to KBZZ with the slogan changing to "96.7 the Buzz" playing the same format.

In 2001, the station was officially licensed for the upgrade from the 2,500 watt station setup located north of Morgan City to a newer location on a tower in the town of Gibson, Louisiana improving the coverage in the Houma/Thibodaux area due to the increase in power to present day 12,000 watts and an increase of roughly 20 meters in height.

In 2006, the station was sold to Sunburst Media-Louisiana, LLC and the format was flipped to a gold (oldies based) adult contemporary format that apparently didn't bring in the listeners as hoped and in August 2007, the station flipped to its current oldies format as KMYO focusing mainly on 1960s and 1970s era top 40 oldies.

In April 2010, the station ended its oldies format and flipped to a newer format consisting of mostly 70s and 80s rock hits, adopting the new moniker Dan.fm in the process.

On May 2, 2011 KMYO-FM changed their call letters to KCIL. On May 9, 2011 KCIL changed their format to country, simulcasting KXMG 107.5 FM.

On July 1, 2011, the simulcast with KXMG ended, which became a Spanish Top 40 outlet and the move to the 96.7 position was complete.

Effective November 11, 2015, the station (along with co-owned KJIN and KXOR-FM) was sold to James Anderson's My Home Team Media, LLC. Effective May 9, 2017, My Home Team Media sold KCIL and KJIN to JLE, Incorporated for $725,000.

Previous logo

References

External links

Radio stations in Louisiana
Country radio stations in the United States
Radio stations established in 1979
1979 establishments in Louisiana